Lovell Harden (December 17, 1917 – November 15, 1996), nicknamed "Big Pitch", was an American Negro league pitcher in the 1940s.

A native of Lauderdale, Mississippi, Harden played for the Cleveland Buckeyes from 1943 to 1945. He died in Erie, Pennsylvania, in 1996 at age 78.

References

External links
 and Seamheads 
 Lovell 'Big Pitch' Harden at Negro League Baseball Players Association

1917 births
1996 deaths
Cleveland Buckeyes players
Baseball pitchers
Baseball players from Mississippi
People from Lauderdale County, Mississippi
20th-century African-American sportspeople